April Fool is a phrase associated with April Fools' Day, celebrated on April 1st.

April Fool or April fool may also refer to:

Film 
April Fool (1926 film), a 1926 romantic comedy starring Diana Serra Cary
April Fool (1964 film), a 1964 Hindi-language film
The April Fools, a 1969 romantic comedy film
April Fool's Day (1986 film), a 1986 mystery slasher film
April Fools (2007 film), a 2007 horror film by Fred Walton
April Fool (2010 film), a 2010 Malayalam-language film
April Fools (2015 film), a 2015 Japanese film

Music
"April Fool" (song), by Chalk Circle from their EP The Great Lake (1986)
"April Fool", a song by Soul Asylum from their album Grave Dancers Union (1992)
"April Fools (song)", a song by Rufus Wainwright from his 1998 self-titled debut album
"April Fools (He Had the Change Done at the Shop)", song on The Frogs' album My Daughter the Broad (1996)

Other
April Fool (spy), the codename for a double agent who allegedly played a key role in the downfall of Saddam Hussein
The April Fool, a character of The Fairly OddParents animated series

See also
April Fool's Day (disambiguation)
"Fools in April", an episode of SpongeBob SquarePants, that aired along with "Neptunes Spatula" on April 1, 2000